This list of Singapore abbreviations sets out abbreviations that are commonly used in Singapore.

Overview
Abbreviations are of three basic kinds:
 Clippings, in which a shortened form of a word occurs. Common clippings in Singapore are: air-con (from "air-conditioner"), condo (from "condominium"), sabo (from "sabotage"), and cert (from "certificate").
 Acronyms, in which the initial letters are formed into a single word, such as scuba, which is derived from "self-contained underwater breathing apparatus". Creation of acronyms such as this is rare in Singaporean English, though TIBS ("Trans-Island Bus Service") and CISCO ("Commercial and Industrial Security Corporation") are found.
 Initialisms, in which the individual letters are spelled out. Some analysts regard initialisms such as these as one kind of acronym, but others prefer to distinguish between the two categories.

Initialisms are extremely common in Singapore, and many have become better known and more widely used than the full form of the words they represent. One example is the Kandang Kerbau Women's and Children's Hospital, which is more commonly referred to as KKH.

The most important category of Singapore initialisms are those for government departments and public institutions. Among the earliest examples are PUB ("Public Utilities Board") and HDB ("Housing Development Board"). Abbreviations such as these were especially important in the past when most Singaporeans were not educated in English, and their use facilitated communication in the public services where the main administrative language is English. Government departments have therefore promoted the use of these initialisms, so they occur even in non-English publications. Although the younger generation of Singaporeans are now all educated in English, abbreviations remain a major characteristic of Singapore English.

There are efforts to maintain some consistency among the initialisms. Three letters are used for government institutions (PUB, HDB, CPF, MOH, CWO) and for expressways (AYE, PIE, KJE), while two letters are used for polytechnics (SP, RP). To maintain this consistency, some abbreviations are not direct initials; for example CTE is used for "Central Expressway"  instead of *CE, and NP is used for "Ngee Ann Polytechnic" instead of *NAP. When the Nanyang Technological University (NTU) was established in 1991, the name was chosen instead of the alternative "Nanyang University of Technology" because the latter would have resulted in the unsuitable NUT. While Anderson Secondary School has shortened its name to ANDSS instead of ASS.

Recently, there have emerged a number of unconventional abbreviations, such as A*STAR for Agency for Science, Technology and Research.) When SAFTI (Singapore Armed Forces Training Institute) was reorganised in 1995, it acquired the name SAFTI Military Institute, further abbreviated as SAFTI MI, which when fully expanded would form a rather awkward title Singapore Armed Forces Training Institute Military Institute.

Abbreviations

0–9
4D - 4-Digits, a Singapore lottery
 5 C's - 5 C's of Singapore: Cash, Car, Credit card, Condominium, Country club
 6 C's - 6 C's of Singapore: Career, Cash, Car, Credit card, Condominium, Country club

A
 A*STAR - Agency for Science, Technology and Research
 AA - Asian Aerospace
 ACS (J) - Anglo-Chinese Junior School
 ACM - Asian Civilisations Museum
 ACPS - Anglo-Chinese Primary School
 ACRES - Animal Concerns Research And Research Society
 ACS - Anglo-Chinese School
 ACS(I) - Anglo-Chinese School (Independent)
 ACSBR - Anglo-Chinese School (Barker Road)
 ACJC - Anglo-Chinese Junior College
 A & G - Allen & Gledhill, a law firm
 AG - Attorney-General
 AGC - Attorney-General's Chambers
 AHS - Anglican High School
 AISS - Ahmad Ibrahim Secondary School, Australian International School Singapore
 AJ - (Pig Latin slang) Gay (typically male)
 AJC - Anderson Junior College (now merged with Serangoon Junior College to form Anderson Serangoon Junior College)
 ALL - Animal Lovers League
 AMK - Ang Mo Kio
 AMP - Association of Muslim Professionals
ANDSS - Anderson Secondary School
 APP - Assistant Public Prosecutor (see also "DPP" and "PP")
 APPLES - Application for Passport On-line Electronic System
 AR - Assistant Registrar of the Supreme Court of Singapore
ASRJC - Anderson Serangoon Junior College
 AWARE - Association of Women for Action and Research
 AWWA - Asian Women Welfare Association
 AY - Academic Year 
 AYE - Ayer Rajah Expressway

B
 BB - Boys' Brigade
 BBSS - Bukit Batok Secondary School
BC - Birth Certificate
 BCA - Building and Construction Authority
 BCM - Bus Contracting Model
 BBDC - Bukit Batok Driving Centre
 BBFA - ( internet slang) Bui Bui Forever Alone
 BBT - Bukit Batok / Bubble Tea
 BDK - Bedok
 BDS - Bedok South Secondary School
 BF - Buddhist Fellowship (Singapore)
 BGR - (slang) boy-girl relationship
 BJ - Bugis Junction
 BKE - Bukit Timah Expressway
 BMT - Basic Military Training
 BPGHS - Bukit Panjang Government High School
 BPLRT - Bukit Panjang LRT Line
 BPP - Bukit Panjang Plaza
 BPT - Basic Police Training
 BPJ - Bukit Panjang
 BRT - Basic Rescue Training
 BSEP - Bus Service Enhancement Programme
 BTO - Build To Order (HDB)
 BTS - Baptist Theological Seminary
 BTT - Basic Theory Test
 BTYSS - Beatty Secondary School
 BVSS - Buona Vista Secondary School
 BWSS - Bowen Secondary School

C
 CAAS - Civil Aviation Authority of Singapore
 CBD - Central Business District
 CBP - Changi Business Park
 CBPU - Central Building Plan Unit
 CCA - Co-curricular activity
 CCC - Chinese Chamber of Commerce; Citizen's Consultative Committee
 CCHS - Chung Cheng High School
 CCK - Choa Chu Kang
 CCL or CC - Circle MRT line
 CCR - Core Central Region
 CDAC - Chinese Development Assistance Council
 CDC - Community Development Council
 CEPAS - Contactless e-Purse Application System
 CHC - City Harvest Church
 CHIJ - Convent of the Holy Infant Jesus
 CHS - Catholic High School, Singapore
 CNB - Central Narcotics Bureau
 CID - Criminal Investigation Department
 CIP - Community Involvement Project (now replaced by "VIA")
 CIQ - Custom & Immigration Quarantine
 CIS -  Corporate Individual Scheme
 CJ - Chief Justice
 CJC - Catholic Junior College
 CMC - Chinese Media & Communication
 CMPB - Central Manpower Base
CNA - Channel NewsAsia
 COE - Certificate of Entitlement
 CPF - Central Provident Fund
 CPIB - Corrupt Practices Investigation Bureau
 CRL - Cross Island MRT line
 CS - Century Square
 CSC - Community Sports Club
 CSM - City Square Mall
 CTE - Central Expressway
CTSS - Clementi Town Secondary School
 CWO - Corrective Work Order
 CWP - Causeway Point
 CWS - Cat Welfare Society

D
 D & D - Dinner & Dance, a function usually organised annually by companies
 D & N - Drew & Napier LLC, a law firm
 DART - Disaster Assistance and Rescue Team
 DBS - Development Bank of Singapore (now known as DBS Bank)
 DBSS - Design, Build and Sell Scheme
 DHS - Dunman High School
 DJ - District Judge
 DMN - Dunman Secondary School
 DPP - Deputy Public Prosecutor (see also "APP" and "PP") or Direct Entry Scheme to Polytechnic Programme (via ITE)
 DR - Deputy Registrar of the Supreme Court or the Subordinate Courts of Singapore
 DSO - Defence Science Organisation
 DSTA - Defence Science and Technology Agency 
 DTE - Downtown East
 DTL or DT - Downtown MRT line

E
 EC - Executive Condominium
 ECP - East Coast Park / East Coast Parkway
 EDB - Economic Development Board
 EDP - Endeavour Primary School
 eGAP - eGovernment Action Plan
EJC - Eunoia Junior College
EP - Employment Pass or Exit Permit
 ERP - Electronic Road Pricing
 EWL or EW - East West MRT line
 EFSS - Edgefield Secondary School

F
 FAS - Financial Assistance Scheme
 FAS - Football Association of Singapore
 FCBC - Faith Community Baptist Church
 FG - Filmgarde Cineplexes
 FHSS - Fuhua Secondary School
 FMSS - Fairfield Methodist Secondary School
 FMPS or FFP - Fairfield Methodist Primary School
 FTT - Final Theory Test
 FT - Foreign Talent

G
 GAD - Go and Die
 GAS - Go-Ahead Singapore
 GB - Girls' Brigade
 GBTB - Gardens by the Bay
 GCE - General Certificate of Education
 GCM - Government Contracting Model (now replaced by Bus Contracting Model)
 GCT - Goh Chok Tong
 GE - Great Eastern
 GEP - Gifted Education Programme
 GIS - Global Indian School
 GP - Gladiolus Place
 GRC - Group representation constituency
 GSS - Great Singapore Sale
 GST - Goods and Services Tax
 GV - Golden Village
 GWA - GEMS World Academy
 GWC - Great World City
 GYSS - Guangyang Secondary School

H
 HCI - Hwa Chong Institution
 HCJC - Hwa Chong Junior College (now merged with The Chinese High School to form Hwa Chong Institution)
 HDB - Housing Development Board
 HEB - Hindu Endowments Board
 HG - Hougang
 HOGC - Heart of God Church
 HIP - Home Improvement Programme
 HPB - Health Promotion Board
 HPPS - Henry Park Primary School
 HS - Hougang Secondary School
 HSA - Health Sciences Authority
HYSS -Hua Yi Secondary School
HSCS -Hai Sing Catholic School

I
 IC - Identity health, In charge or Identification Certificate/Card
 ICBC - Industrial and Commercial Bank of China
 ICA - Immigration & Checkpoints Authority
 ICS - International Community School of Singapore
 IDA - Infocomm Development Authority of Singapore
 IJC - Innova Junior College (now merged with Yishun Junior College to form Yishun Innova Junior College)
IMDA - Infocomm Media Development Authority of Singapore
IMH - Institute of Mental Health
 IO - Investigation Officer
 IP - Integrated Programme
 IPPT - Individual Physical Proficiency Test
 IR - Integrated Resort
 IRO - Inter-Religious Organisation of Singapore
 ISA - Internal Security Act
 ISD - Internal Security Department
 ITE - Institute of Technical Education
 IUP - Interim Upgrading Programme

J
 J - Judge (plural: JJ)
 J8 - Junction 8 Shopping Centre
 JA - Judge of Appeal (plural: JJA)
 JB - Johor Bahru
 JC - Judicial Commissioner or Junior College
 JCA - Jewel Changi Airport
 JBJ - Joshua Benjamin Jeyaretnam
 JEM - Jurong East Mall
 JEMP - Jurong East Modification Project
 JJC - Jurong Junior College (now merged with Pioneer Junior College to form Jurong Pioneer Junior College)
 JP - Jurong Point Shopping Mall
JPJC - Jurong Pioneer Junior College
 JPS - Jagoh Primary School
 JRL or JR - Jurong Region MRT line
JSS - Jurong Secondary School
 JTC - Jurong Town Corporation (now known as JTC Corporation)

K
 KIV - Keep In View; refers to items, documents or papers that should be kept around for later consideration
 KJE - Kranji Expressway
 KK - Kandang Kerbau Women's and Children's Hospital
 KL - Kuala Lumpur, Malaysia
 KMSPKS - Kong Meng San Phor Kark See Monastery
 KPE - Kallang-Paya Lebar Expressway
 KTPH - Khoo Teck Puat Hospital

L
 LCK - Lim Chu Kang
 LCCS - Lutheran Community Care Services
 LHL - Lee Hsien Loong
 LKCM - Lee Kong Chian School of Medicine, NTU
 LKY - Lee Kuan Yew
 LRT - Light Rapid Transit
 LTA - Land Transport Authority
 LUP - Lift Upgrading Programme
 LYSS - Loyang Secondary School

M
 MAH - Mount Alvernia Hospital
 MAS - Monetary Authority of Singapore
 MBFC - Marina Bay Financial Centre
 MBLM - Marina Bay Link Mall
 MBS - Marina Bay Sands
 MBSC - Marina Bay Singapore Countdown
 MC - Medical Certificate
 MCD - Ministry of Community Development (now MCYS)
 MCE - Marina Coastal Expressway
 MCI - Ministry of Communications and Information
 MCS - Methodist Church in Singapore
 MCYS - Ministry of Community Development, Youth and Sports (Singapore)
 MDA - Media Development Authority
 MDIS - Management Development Institute of Singapore
 MENDAKI - Yayasan MENDAKI (formerly the Council for the Education of Muslim Children, now the Council for the Development of Singapore Muslim Community)
 MGS - Methodist Girls' School
 MI - Millennia Institute
 MJC - Meridian Junior College (now merged with Tampines Junior College to form Tampines Meridian Junior College)
 MJR - Manjusri Secondary School
 MINDEF - Ministry of Defence (Singapore)
 MINDS - Movement For The Intellectually Disabled Of Singapore 
 MOE - Ministry of Education (Singapore)
 MOF - Ministry of Finance (Singapore)
 MOH - Ministry of Health (Singapore)
 MOM - Ministry of Manpower (Singapore)
 MOS - Minister of State
 MRT - Mass Rapid Transit
MSCP - Multi Storey Car Park
MSHS - Maris Stella High School
 MSL - Marsiling Secondary School
 MSS - Meridian Secondary School or Montfort Secondary School
 MUIS - Majlis Ugama Islam Singapura (Islamic Religious Council of Singapore)

N

NAPS - Ngee Ann Primary School
 NAFA - Nanyang Academy of Fine Arts
NAPFA - National Physical Fitness Award
 NAS - National Archives of Singapore
 NCC - National Cadet Corps (Singapore) or New Creation Church
 NCDCC - National Civil Defence Cadet Corps (Singapore)
 NCMP - Non-constituency Member of Parliament
 NCS - National Computer Systems
 NCSS - National Council of Social Service
 NDP - National Day Parade
 NE - National Education
 NEA - National Environment Agency
 NEL or NE - North East MRT line
 NETS - Network for Electronic Transfers
 NHG - National Healthcare Group
 NHHS - Nan Hua High School
 NIE - National Institute of Education
 NJC - National Junior College
 NKF - National Kidney Foundation Singapore
 NLB - National Library Board
 NMP - Nominated Member of Parliament
 NMS - National Museum of Singapore
 NP - Ngee Ann Polytechnic
 NPARKS - National Parks Board
 NPCC - National Police Cadet Corps
 NRIC - National Registration Identity Card
 NRP - Neighbourhood Renewal Programme
 NS - National Service in Singapore
 NSE - North–South Expressway (Singapore)
 NSF - Full-time National Servicemen
 NSL or NS - North South MRT line
 NSTB - National Science and Technology Board
 NTC - National Technical Certificate
 NTFGH - Ng Teng Fong General Hospital
 NTPS - New Town Primary School
 NTU - Nanyang Technological University
 NTUC - National Trade Union Congress
 NUH - National University Hospital
 NUHS - National University Health System
 NUS - National University of Singapore
 NUSH or NUSHS - National University of Singapore High School of Mathematics and Science
 NWC - National Wages Council
 NYGH - Nanyang Girls' High School
 NYK - Nanyang Kindergarten
 NYP - Nanyang Polytechnic
 NYPS - Nanyang Primary School
 NYJC - Nanyang Junior College

O
 OB -  Out of Bounds (see OB marker)
 OBS - Outward Bound Singapore
 OCBC - Oversea-Chinese Banking Corporation
 OCR - Outside of Central Region
 OCS - Officer Cadet School (Singapore)
 OFS - Overseas Family School
 OPSS - Orchid Park Secondary School
 ORD - Operationally Ready Date, refers to the date on which a National Serviceman completes his 2-year term of service.
 OSS - Outram Secondary School
 OUB - Overseas Union Bank
 O$P$ - owe money, pay money – used in loan sharks' harassing graffiti.

P
 PA - People's Association
 PAP - People's Action Party
 PCK - Phua Chu Kang, a popular TV sitcom
 PDI - Private Driving Instructor
 PE - Physical Education
 PES - Physical Employment Status. Pre-enlistment medical categorisation used by the Singapore Armed Forces to determine fitness for combat or non-combat duties
 PFP - Polytechnic Foundation Programme
 PG or PGL - Punggol
PGP - Prince George's Park Residences, NUS
 PHS - Presbyterian High School
 PIE - Pan Island Expressway
 PJC - Pioneer Junior College (now merged with Jurong Junior College to form Jurong Pioneer Junior College)
 PLQ - Paya Lebar Quarter
 PLS - Paya Lebar Square
 PLU - People Like Us, a gay equality lobby group
 POSB - Post Office Savings Bank (now known as POSBank)
 PP - Public Prosecutor (see also "APP" and "DPP") or Parkway Parade
 PROGRESS - Providing Opportunities through Growth, Remaking Singapore for Success
 PS - Plaza Singapura
 PSA - Port of Singapore Authority (now known as PSA International)
 PSC - Public Service Commission
 PSLE - Primary School Leaving Examination
 PSP - Progress Singapore Party
 PSR - Pasir Ris
 PUB - Public Utilities Board
 PWD - Public Works Department
 PR - Permanent resident
 PT - Practical Test or Physical Training
 PDL - Provisional Driving Licence
 PLMGPS - Paya Lebar Methodist Girls' School (Primary)
 PLMGSS - Paya Lebar Methodist Girls' School (Secondary)

Q
 QDL - Qualified Driving Licence
QPS - Qihua Primary School

R
 R & T - Rajah & Tann, a law firm
 RC - Residents' Committee
 RCR - Rest of Central Region
 RCS - Radio Corporation of Singapore
 RCY - Singapore Red Cross Youth
 REP - Renaissance Engineering Programme
 RGPS - Raffles Girls' Primary School
 RGS - Raffles Girls' School
 RI - Raffles Institution
 RJ or RJC - Raffles Junior College
 RMPS - Radin Mas Primary School
 ROM - Registry of Marriages
 RP - Republic Polytechnic
 RRP - Recommended retail price
 RS - Rosyth School
 RSAF - Republic of Singapore Air Force
 RSN - Republic of Singapore Navy
RSS - Riverside Secondary School or Republic of Singapore Ship
 RWS - Resorts World Sentosa
 RVHS - River Valley High School, Singapore
RVRC - Ridge View Residential College, NUS

S
 SAF - Singapore Armed Forces
 SAFRA - SAFRA National Service Association
 SAJC - St Andrew's Junior College
 SAL - Singapore Academy of Law
 SAM - Singapore Art Museum
 SANA - Singapore Anti-Narcotics Association
 SAP - Special Assistance Plan
 SAR - Senior Assistant Registrar of the Supreme Court of Singapore
 SAS - Singapore American School
 SAWL - Singapore Association of Women Lawyers
SBF - Singapore Buddhist Federation
 SBI - State Bank of India
 SBM - Singapore Buddhist Mission
 SBS or SBST - SBS Transit
 SBW - Sembawang
 SBYM - Singapore Buddhist Youth Mission
 SC - Senior Counsel
 SChO - Singapore Chemistry Olympiad
 SCDF - Singapore Civil Defence Force
 SCGS - Singapore Chinese Girls' School
 SCS - Specialist Cadet School or Science Centre Singapore or Singapore Computer Systems
 SDA - Singapore Democratic Alliance
 SDJ - Senior District Judge
 SDP - Singapore Democratic Party
 SDU - Social Development Unit
 SERS - Selective En bloc Redevelopment Scheme
 SFC - SkillsFuture Credit
 SFI - Singapore Food Industries
 SG - Solicitor-General
 SGH - Singapore General Hospital
 SGSS - Serangoon Garden Secondary School
 SGX - Singapore Exchange
 SIA or SQ - Singapore Airlines
 SICC - Singapore Island Country Club
SILS - Singapore Institute of Labour Studies
 SIM - Singapore Institute of Management
 SINDA - Singapore Indian Development Association
 SIO - Senior Investigation Officer
 SIT - Singapore Institute of Technology
 SJAB - St. John Ambulance Brigade
 SJI - St. Joseph's Institution
 SJII - St. Joseph's Institution International
 SJIJ - St. Joseph's Institution Junior
 SK - Sengkang
 SKH - Sengkang General Hospital
 SLA - Singapore Land Authority
SLF - Singapore Labour Foundation
 SLO - Singapore Lyric Opera
 SLS - Sim Lim Square
 SLSS - Si Ling Secondary School
SLT - Sim Lim Tower
 SMF - Singapore Manufacturers' Federation
 SMC - Single Member Constituency
 SMO - Singapore Mathematics Olympiad
 SMRT - SMRT Corporation
 SMSS - St. Margaret's Secondary School
 SMU - Singapore Management University
 SNO - Special Needs Officer
 SNOC - Singapore National Olympic Council
 SNPC - Singapore National Paralympic Council
 SOS - Samaritans of Singapore or (slang) struggling in silence
 SOTA - School of the Arts, Singapore
 SP - Singapore Polytechnic
 SPA - School-based Practical Assessment (for students taking GCE 'O' level)
 SPC - SingPost Centre
 SPCA - Society for the Prevention of Cruelty to Animals
 SPF - Singapore Police Force
 SPH - Singapore Press Holdings
 SPG - (slang) sarong party girl
 SPS - Saint Patrick's School
 SPhO - Singapore Physics Olympiad
 SRCS - Singapore Red Cross Society
 SRJC - Serangoon Junior College (now merged with Anderson Junior College to form Anderson Serangoon Junior College)
 SS - Social Studies
 SSC - Singapore Sports Council or Singapore Swimming Club
 SSDC - Singapore Safety Driving Centre
 SSO - Singapore Symphony Orchestra
 SST - School of Science and Technology, Singapore or Singapore Standard Time
 ST - Singapore Technologies or The Straits Times or SingTel
STAR - Special Tactics and Rescue
 STARIS - SMRT Active Route Map Information System
STB - Singapore Tourism Board
STV or SH - StarHub (formerly StarHub TV or Singapore Cable Vision)
 SUSS - Singapore University of Social Sciences
 SUTD - Singapore University of Technology and Design
 SVPS - South View Primary School
 SYAS - San Yu Adventist School
SYF - Singapore Youth Festival
 SYFC - Singapore Youth Flying Club
 SYOGOC - Singapore Youth Olympic Games Organising Committee
 SYT - Sweet Young Thing

T
 TA - Temasek Academy
 TBP - Tiong Bahru Plaza
 TCHS - The Chinese High School (now merged with Hwa Chong Junior College to form Hwa Chong Institution)
 TCS - Television Corporation of Singapore
 TEL or TE - Thomson–East Coast MRT line
 TH - Temasek Hall, NUS
 TIBS - Trans-Island Bus Services
 TJC - Temasek Junior College
 TKGS - Tanjong Katong Girls' School
 TKSS - Tanjong Katong Secondary School
 TM - Tampines Mall
TMJC - Tampines Meridian Junior College
 TMS - Temasek Secondary School
 TNS - Tao Nan School
TNP - The New Paper
 TOP - Temporary Occupancy Permit
 TP - Temasek Polytechnic or Traffic Police
 TPY - Toa Payoh
TPG - Tanjong Pagar
 TPJC - Tampines Junior College (now merged with Merdian Junior College to form Tampines Meridian Junior College)
 TPS - Tampines Primary School
 TPSS - Tampines Secondary School
 TTC - Trinity Theological College, Singapore
 TTS - Tanglin Trust School or Tower Transit Singapore
 TTSH - Tan Tock Seng Hospital
 TSS - Tanglin Secondary School

U
 UEN - Unique Entity Number
 UOB - United Overseas Bank
 URA - Urban Redevelopment Authority
 UP - Usual Price
 USS - Universal Studios Singapore
 UWC or UWCSEA - United World College of South East Asia

V
VIA - Values in Action (replaces "CIP")
VJC - Victoria Junior College
 VS - Victoria School
 VSS - Vegetarian Society (Singapore)
 VWO - Voluntary Welfare Organisation

W
 WDL - Woodlands, Singapore
WDP - Woodlands Primary School
WPS - Woodgrove Primary School
WGS - Woodgrove Secondary School
WP - Workers' Party of Singapore or Work Permit
 WS - White Sands
 WSS - Whitley Secondary School or Woodlands Secondary School
 WSSS - West Spring Secondary School
 WWP - Waterway Point
WWSS - Westwood Secondary School

X
 XMM - Xiao Mei Mei (小妹妹，literally 'small girl')
 XHH - Xiao Hun Hun (小混混，literally 'young gangster')
 XMS - Xinmin Secondary School
Y
 YCKSS - Yio Chu Kang Secondary School
YHSS - Yuhua Secondary School
 YJC - Yishun Junior College (now merged with Innova Junior College to form Yishun Innova Junior College)
YIJC - Yishun Innova Junior College
YLL(SM) - Yong Loo Lin (School of Medicine), NUS
 YP - Young Punk
 YSS - Yishun Secondary School
 YTSS - Yishun Town Secondary School
 YIS - Yishun
 YNC - Yale-NUS College
Z
 ZHPS - Zhenghua Primary School or Zhonghua Primary School
ZHSS - Zhonghua Secondary School
ZSS - Zhenghua Secondary School

Abbreviations in the military
This is a list of abbreviations commonly used in the Singapore Armed Forces, including slang terms. They are often used in place of the expanded form of the words. Some abbreviations are similar to those used in other military. Other abbreviations may be identical to those used outside of military but with differing context.

People

Ranks

These ranks are arranged in descending order of seniority

Officers

 COL - Colonel
 SLTC - Senior Lieutenant Colonel
 LTC - Lieutenant Colonel
 MAJ - Major
 CPT - Captain
 LTA - Lieutenant
 2LT - Second Lieutenant
 OCT - Officer Cadet

Warrant officers
 CWO - Chief Warrant Officer
 SWO - Senior Warrant Officer
 MWO - Master Warrant Officer
 1WO - First Warrant Officer (formerly Warrant Officer Class 1, "WO1" or "WOI")
 2WO - Second Warrant Officer (formerly Warrant Officer Class 2, "WO2" or "WOII")
 3WO - Third Warrant Officer

Specialists
 MSG - Master Sergeant
 SSG - Staff Sergeant
 1SG - First Sergeant
 2SG - Second Sergeant
 3SG - Third Sergeant
 SGT - Sergeant (defunct – replaced by "1SG", "2SG" and "3SG")
 SCT - Specialist Cadet

Enlistees
 CFC - Corporal First Class
 CPL - Corporal
 LCP - Lance Corporal
 PFC - Private First Class
 PTE - Private
 REC - Recruit

Other Ranks

Military Domain Experts 

 ME8 - Military Expert 8
 ME7 - Military Expert 7
 ME6 - Military Expert 6
 ME5 - Military Expert 5
 ME4 - Military Expert 4
 ME4(A) - Military Expert 4 (Apprentice)
 ME4(T) - Military Expert 4 (Trainee)
 ME3 - Military Expert 3
 ME2 - Military Expert 2
 ME1 - Military Expert 1
 ME1(T) - Military Expert 1 (Trainee)

SAF Volunteer Corps 

 SV 4 - SAF Volunteer 4
 SV 3 - SAF Volunteer 3
 SV 2 - SAF Volunteer 2
 SV 1 - SAF Volunteer 1
 SV (T) - SAF Volunteer (Trainee)

Appointments and offices
 2IC - Second-in-charge (see "IC")
 ASM - Army Sergeant Major
 BC - Battery Commander
BDO - Battery Duty Officer
 BOS - Battalion Orderly Sergeant or Brigade Orderly Sergeant
 BSM - Battery Sergeant Major or Brigade Sergeant Major
 BSO - Battalion Signal Officer
BQMS - or "BQ" - Battery Quartermaster Sergeant
 CAO - Chief Armour Officer
 CAF - Chief of Air Force
 CCO - Camp Commandant's Office
 CDF - Chief of Defence Force
 CDO - Company Duty Officer
 CDS - Company Duty Sergeant
 CMC - Chief of Medical Corps
 CNV - Chief of Navy
 CO - Commanding Officer
 COA - Chief of Army
 COS - Company Orderly Sergeant
 CQMS - or "CQ" - Company Quartermaster Sergeant
 CSM - Company Sergeant Major
 DDO - Divisional Duty Officer
 DO - Duty Officer
DOO - Duty Orderly Officer
 DOS - Duty Orderly Sergeant
DS - Duty Sergeant
 DSM - Division Sergeant Major
 Dy S1 - Deputy Manpower Officer
 Dy S2 - Deputy Intelligence Officer
 Dy S3 - Deputy Training and Operation Officer
 Dy S4 - Deputy Logistics Officer
 FDO - Field Duty Officer
 FS - Fitness Specialist
 FSM - Formation Sergeant Major
 IC - (person) in command or in charge (see also "2IC")
 IO - Intelligence Officer or Investigating Officer
 MO - Medical Officer
 MTO - Military Transport Officer
 NO - Nursing Officer
 NCO - Non-Commissioned Officer (defunct – replaced by "Specialist")
 OC - Officer Commanding (Company Commander in other militaries)
 PC - Platoon Commander
 PS - Platoon Sergeant
 PSO - Principal Staff Officer
 PTI - Physical Training Instructor
 QM - Quartermaster - usually a commissioned officer or a senior warrant officer
 RQMS - Regimental Quartermaster Sergeant - usually a warrant officer in the SAF
 RSM - Regimental Sergeant Major
 S1 - Manpower Officer
 S2 - Intelligence Officer
 S3 - Training and Operation Officer
 S4 - Logistics Officer
 SDO - School Duty Officer (use is limited to training schools)
 SM - Sergeant Major
SSM - School Sergeant Major
 WOSA - Warrant officers, specialists and airmen
 WOSE - Warrant officers, specialists and enlistees
 WOSPEC - Warrant officers and specialists

Units and organizations
 ADF - Army Deployment Force
 AFTC - Air Force Training Command
 AMB - Army Maintenance Base
 BB - Boys' Brigade
 BMTC - Basic Military Training Centre
 CAD - Combined Arms Division
 CDO - Singapore Commandos
 CMPB - Central Manpower Base
 CSSCOM - Combat Service Support Command
CTI - Commando Training Institute
 DISCOM - Division Support Command
 DSMB - Direct Support Maintenance Battalion (defunct, now renamed as "AMB" or Army Maintenance Base)
 DS Med Bn - Direct Support Medical Battalion
 DSSB - Direct Support Supply Battalion
 DSTA - Defence Science Technology Agency
 EOD - Explosive Ordnance Disposal
 FCC - Fitness Conditioning Centre
 FDS - Field Defence Squadron
 GDS - Singapore Guards
 GG - Girl Guide
 GB - Girls' Brigade 
 JID - Joint Intelligence Directorate
 JOPD - Joint Operations and Planning Directorate
 MES - Maintenance and Engineering Support
 MP - Military Police
 MMI - Military Medicine Institute
 NCC - National Cadet Corps (Singapore)
 NCDCC - National Civil Defence Cadet Corps 
 NDU - Naval Diving Unit (Singapore)
 NPCC - National Police Cadet Corps
 OCS - Officer Cadet School
 OETI - Ordnance Engineering Training Institute (Defunct: renamed to OES - OETI Engineering School)
 PCC - Psychological Care Centre
 RCY - Singapore Red Cross Youth
 PDF - People's Defence Force
 RSAF - Republic of Singapore Air Force
 RSN - Republic of Singapore Navy
 SA - Singapore Artillery
 SAF - Singapore Armed Forces
 SAFAC - Singapore Armed Forces Ammunition Command
 SAFPU - Singapore Armed Forces Provost Unit (defunct, reorganised into the Singapore Armed Forces Military Police Command)
 SAFMPC - Singapore Armed Forces Military Police Command
 SAFRA - Singapore Armed Forces Reservists' Association (the term "reservist" has generally been replaced by "Operationally Ready NSmen")
 SAFSA - Singapore Armed Forces Sports Association
 SAR - Singapore Armoured Regiment
 SCC - SAF Counselling Centre
 SCE - Singapore Combat Engineers
SFLS - Special Forces Leadership School
 SI - Signal Institute
 SIB - Singapore Infantry Brigade or Special Investigation Branch
 SIR - Singapore Infantry Regiment
 SISPEC - School of Infantry Specialist
 SMI - School of Military Intelligence
 SMM - School of Military Medicine (reorganised as SMTI in 2006)
 SMTI - SAF Medical Training Institute
 SOC - School of Commandos (defunct, reorganised into the Commando Training Institute)
SOCC - Special Operations Command Centre
 SOF - Special Operations Force
SOTAC - Special Operations Tactics Centre
SOTC - Special Operations Training Centre
SOTSC - Special Operations Support Centre
 SPT - School of Physical Training
 SRC - Singapore Red Cross

Places
 265 - formerly a hill in Marsiling with an elevation of 265 feet which was used for training; it has been levelled for urban development.
 ATEC - Army Training and Evaluation Center
 BCTC - Basic Combat Training Center
PLC - Pasir Laba Camp
PRC - Pasir Ris Camp
 SAFTI - Singapore Armed Forces Training Institute (term now defunct)
 SAFTI MI - SAFTI Military Institute

Weapons, vehicles and equipment
 A-veh - a heavy vehicle, such as an armoured vehicle
 APC - Armoured Personnel Carrier
 AVLB - Armoured Vehicle Launched Bridge
 B-veh - non-"A-veh" vehicles, such as rovers and trucks
 FAD - first aid dressing
 FBO - full battle order (compare "SBO")
 FFR - (with reference to a land rover) fitted for radio
FH88 - Field Howitzer 88
 FH2000 - Field Howitzer 2000
 GPMG - General Purpose Machine Gun – refers in particular to the FN MAG used in the Singapore Armed Forces
 HMG - Heavy machine gun
 IBA - Integrated body armour
 IFV - Infantry Fighting Vehicle
 LAW - Light Anti-tank Weapon
 LBV - Load Bearing Vest
 LST - Landing Ship Tank
 MOP - Medic Operational Pouch (previously Medical Orderly Pouch)
 RCK - rifle cleaning kit
SAR - refers to SAR 21
 SAW - Section Assault Weapon (usually refers to the Ultimax 100)
 SBO - Standard (formerly Skeletal) Battle Order (compare "FBO")
 SSPH 1 or SSPH - Singapore Self-Propelled Howitzer 1 Primus
 TL - Troop lift - When recruits use a tonner to get to the ferry terminal from BMTC school 4, which is further inland

Slang
 FO - fall out; fuck off
 LOBO - left out of battle order (refers to a soldier who has not been assigned a fixed vocation)
LLST - lan lan suck thumb, meaning to embrace the fact and continue
 NATO - no action, talk only
 Pikachu - from the hokkien expression "bai kah bai chew", meaning crippled
 SBC - simply boh chup – indifferent, not caring (from the abbreviation of the Singapore Broadcasting Corporation)
 WALI - walk around, look important
 ROC - relax one corner
 OTOT - own time own target
 RSAF - rarely seen after five. Also the acronym for the Republic of Singapore Air Force. 
 SOC - siam one corner, that is, to hide somewhere in order to avoid meeting one's superiors, doing work, etc. (from the abbreviation of "Standard Obstacle Course")

Others
 11B - SAF 11B, the military identity card, referring to the eleven pieces of basic information written.
 1206 - SAF 1206, a form signed to acknowledge deductions made to a soldier's payroll for damaging or losing equipment, etc. (pronounced "twelve-O-six")
 1211 - SAF 1211, an issue and receipt voucher for proof of receiving and issuing of goods.
 302 - SAF 302, a form signed to declare own homosexual orientation (pronounced "three-O-two")
15A - SAF 15A, a temporary document used alongside a photo ID card and police report, in place of a lost or stolen 11B
 ACCT - Advanced Close Combat Training
 AI - Armoured Infantry troopers
 AOC - Advanced Obstacle Course
 ATP - Advanced Trainfire Package
 Attend B - medical status that allows soldier to perform only light duties
 Attend C - medical status that exempts soldier from all duties
 AWOL - Absent Without Official Leave
 BAC - Battle Assault Course
 BCCT - Basic Close Combat Training
 BER - beyond economic repair
BIBO - book-in/book-out (book)
 BIC - Battle Inoculation Course
 BMT - Basic Military Training
 BRO - Battalion Routine Order
 BTP - Basic Trainfire Package
 BUA - Built-up area (see also "FIBUA")
 C3 - command, control and communication (pronounced "C-three" or "C-cube")
 CBRE - Chemical, Biological, Radiological and Explosive Defence Group
 CIS - Chartered Industries of Singapore
 CMTL - Centralised Motor Transport Line
 COC - Change of Command Parade
 CP - Command Post
 CRO - Company Routine Orders
CS - Combat Shoot
 CST - Combat Survival Training
 DB - detention barracks
 DIV - division
 DOD - date of disruption
 EVAC - evacuation
FATEP - Field Artillery Training Evaluation Phase
FFE - fire for effect
 FFF - Fit For Firing certification
 FFI - Fitness For Instructions
 FIBUA - fighting in built-up area (see also "BUA")
 FO - Forward Observer, soldier who corrects artillery fire
 FOFO - fighting on Fortified objectives
FPF - final protective fire
G50 - G50, a form submitted for security clearance in military or government sectors
 GLS - Ground Logistics Support
 HCC - High Confidence Course
 HOTO - Hand over take over
 IA - Immediate Action, a pre-trained drill for responding to a certain situation
 ICCT - Intermediate Close Combat Training
 ICT - In Camp Training (also simply known as in-camp)
 IFC - Individual Field Craft
 IMT - Individual Marksmanship Trainer
 IPPT - Individual Physical Proficiency Test
IPT - Individual Physical Proficiency Test (IPPT) Preparatory Training Programme
 L/F - live firing
LD - medical status that allows soldiers to perform only light duties
LOA - letter of authority/authorisation
 OOC - Out of Course
 OOT - Out of Training
 ORD - Operationally Ready Date (formerly "ROD")
QI - Quarterly Inspection certification
RMJ - medical status that excuses soldiers from running, marching and jumping
 RO - Routine Orders
 ROD - Run Out Date (now "ORD")
 PES - Physical Employment Status
 SOC - Standard Obstacle Course
 SOL - stoppage of leave
 TH - Technical Handling
 UFF - unfit for firing
VOC - Vocation Obstacle Course
 WH - White Horse marking in medical docket indicative of special treatment required

Abbreviations in transport
As in most other major cities, abbreviations are commonly used in transport-related matters. The most prominent are the three-letter abbreviations of the expressways in Singapore; all, except one, end with the letter "E":
 AYE - Ayer Rajah Expressway
 BKE - Bukit Timah Expressway
 CTE - Central Expressway
 ECP - East Coast Parkway
 KJE - Kranji Expressway
 KPE - Kallang-Paya Lebar Expressway
 MCE - Marina Coastal Expressway
 NSE - North-South Expressway
 PIE - Pan Island Expressway
 SLE - Seletar Expressway
 TPE - Tampines Expressway

With the introduction of the Expressway Monitoring and Advisory System (EMAS) in 1998, LED signboards were installed along the expressways to display warning and other informational messages to road users. This led to the increased use of abbreviations, some of which are less common and not easily understood. The following are examples of abbreviations used in the EMAS:
 NTH RD - North Road
 STH RD - South Road
 (CCK) DR - (Choa Chu Kang) Drive
 TOWN HALL - Jurong Town Hall Road
 (TP) AVE 10 - (Tampines) Avenue 10
 LT - left
 RT - right
 AFT - after
 BEF - before
 LN - lane
 SH - shoulder

See also
 Singlish

Notes

References

External links
 The Coxford Singlish Dictionary @ Talkingcock.com
 A Dictionary of Singlish and Singapore English
 Singapore Acronyms and Abbreviations

Abbreviations
Singapore
Abbreviations